Yevgeni Vasilyevich Fokin (12 October 1909 – 12 November 1972) was a Soviet football goalkeeper and coach.

In 1925, he began his career in Podolsk and in 1930 he moved to Dinamo Moscow. In 1944, severe injury forced him to end his playing career. He defended the team colors of Moscow (1930-1934, 1939–1940) and the Russian SFSR (1932-1933).

In 1944, he began his coaching career. First, to 1948, he helped to train Dinamo Moscow. In 1950, he was appointed head coach of Dynamo Kiev and Dinamo Minsk in 1952. In 1954, he returned to Dinamo Moscow, this time as director of the club. From 1958 he was head of the youth reserve school Dinamo Moscow. From 1962 to September 1963 he managed Daugava Riga. He later worked as an officer in the Russian SFSR Sport Committee. He also held the position of director of the club Lokomotiv Moscow and Motor Vladimir. He died on November 12, 1972, in Moscow at the age of 63 years.

Fokin was champion of the USSR in 1937 and 1940, winner of the USSR Cup in 1937
and was awarded the title Honoured Master of Sports of the USSR in 1945.

References

External links
 

1909 births
People from Podolsk
1972 deaths
Soviet footballers
Soviet football managers
Soviet Top League players
FC Dynamo Moscow players
FC Dynamo Kyiv managers
FC Dinamo Minsk managers
Association football goalkeepers
Sportspeople from Moscow Oblast